Delio Fernández Cruz (born 17 February 1986) is a Spanish cyclist, who currently rides for UCI Continental team .

Major results

2006
 3rd Oñate Saria
2011
 1st Clássica Amarante
 6th Klasika Primavera
2012
 8th Overall Vuelta a Guatemala
2013
 1st Overall GP Liberty Seguros
 1st Stage 3 Volta a Portugal
 2nd Overall Grande Prémio Jornal de Notícias
 3rd Vuelta a la Comunidad de Madrid
 4th Overall Volta ao Alentejo
 4th Overall Troféu Joaquim Agostinho
 5th Overall Vuelta a Asturias
 7th Overall Tour do Rio
2014
 1st  Overall Troféu Joaquim Agostinho
 3rd Overall Volta a Portugal
2015
 2nd Overall Volta ao Alentejo
 2nd Overall Troféu Joaquim Agostinho
 4th Overall Volta a Portugal
1st Stages 2 & 7
 5th Overall Vuelta a Castilla y León
 5th Overall Tour do Rio
2016
 4th Overall Tour of Austria
 6th Overall Four Days of Dunkirk
2017
 2nd Overall Tour of Austria
2018
 4th Tour du Gévaudan Occitanie
 7th Overall Tour of Turkey
 7th Overall Tour of Almaty
 10th Overall Sharjah International Cycling Tour
2019
 9th Circuito de Getxo
2020
 9th Overall Tour de Taiwan
 10th Overall Volta a Portugal
2021
 7th Overall Presidential Tour of Turkey
2022
 6th Overall Volta a Portugal
 8th Overall Troféu Joaquim Agostinho

References

External links

1986 births
Living people
Spanish male cyclists
Sportspeople from Moaña
Cyclists from Galicia (Spain)